The Buhre Avenue station is a local station on the IRT Pelham Line of the New York City Subway. Located at the intersection of Buhre and Westchester Avenues in the Pelham Bay neighborhood of the Bronx, it is served by the  train at all times except weekdays in the peak direction, when the <6> train takes over.


History 
This station opened on December 20, 1920 with the extension of the Pelham Line from Westchester Square to Pelham Bay Park. Service was originally provided by a mix of through and shuttle trains during the 1920s.

From July 5, 2014, to April 27, 2015, as part of a $109 million rebuilding project at five Pelham Line stations, this station, along with Zerega Avenue, was closed for station rehabilitation work.

Station layout

There are three tracks and two side platforms. The center track is not used in regular service. It resembles other elevated stations along the line in that it has a wood mezzanine and no windscreens along the platform edges.

The platform lights are sodium vapor, but the wood mezzanine only has old-style lights that are quite dim. There are non-working old lights on the platform, covered old signs, and two extra exits from the fare control area. Holding lights have been added in two places along the uptown platform, so that trains can be kept at this station when the two tracks at the Pelham Bay Park terminal are occupied.

Exits
The station's only exit is a mezzanine beneath the tracks. Outside fare control, stairs lead to the northern, western, and southern corners of the seven-pointed intersection of Westchester, Buhre, Crosby, and Edison Avenues.

References

External links 

 
 Station Reporter — 6 Train
 The Subway Nut — Buhre Avenue Pictures 
 Buhre Avenue entrance from Google Maps Street View
 Platforms from Google Maps Street View

IRT Pelham Line stations
New York City Subway stations in the Bronx
Railway stations in the United States opened in 1920
1920 establishments in New York City